Cheston Folkes (September 27, 1863 – June 10, 1941) was a farmer from St. Francisville, Louisiana, who served in the Louisiana House of Representatives for West Feliciana Parish in three nonconsecutive stints from 1908 to 1920, 1924 to 1932, and 1936 to 1940.

His son, Warren Davis Folkes of St. Francisville, also served in the state House, nonconsecutively, from 1944 to 1955 and 1968 to 1976, and in the Louisiana State Senate from 1955 to 1968.

References

1863 births
1941 deaths
Democratic Party members of the Louisiana House of Representatives
People from St. Francisville, Louisiana
Farmers from Louisiana
Episcopalians from Louisiana
Burials in Louisiana